Olga Cossettini (18 August 1897 - May 23, 1987) was an Argentine teacher, educator, and pedagogue. She spent her career, together with her sister, Leticia Cossettini, transforming traditional schooling.

Biography 
Olga Cossettini was born 18 August 1897, in San Jorge, Santa Fe Province, Argentina.

She graduated from the Normal School of Coronda in Santa Fe. She received international scholarships from the Guggenheim Foundation in 1941 and 1942, the British Council in 1961, and the D'Accueil Committee in France in 1961.

In 1935, Cossettini created and became a director of the "active school", which was a project she developed with her sister, Leticia (PK). It existed till 1950. In this school the experience was based on incorporating activities such as art, music and acting.

Cossettini was also a founder of the School of Higher Teachers, of the Institute of Education Sciences and of the Primary School.

Death and legacy
Cossettini died May 23, 1987, Rosario, Santa Fe, Argentina.

In 1992, five years after her death, the documentary "The School of Miss Olga" was made to commemorate her.

On August 18, 2015, Google celebrated her 117th birthday with a Google Doodle.

Awards and honours
In 1985, Cossettini was awarded with the title Illustrious Citizen of the City of Rosario in Santa Fe.

Selected works
 "Escuela serena" (1935)
 "Escuela viva" (1939)
 "El niño, su expresión" (1940)
 "Adult education in England"(1965).

References 

1897 births
1987 deaths
Women educators